Force of Execution is a 2013 direct-to-video action crime film directed by Keoni Waxman, written by Richard Beattie and Michael Black, and starring Steven Seagal, Ving Rhames, and Danny Trejo. The movie marks the fourth collaboration between Steven Seagal and Keoni Waxman (following The Keeper, A Dangerous Man, and Maximum Conviction), and the fourth collaboration between Steven Seagal and executive producer Binh Dang (following Into the Sun, True Justice, and Maximum Conviction). The film is set and filmed in Albuquerque, New Mexico.

Keoni Waxman said "The movie is a different tone than the previous films – a crazy, violent ‘grindhouse’ style... There isn't as much gun play as Max Con but we wanted to go old school and make a sort of ‘western kung fu movie’ on this one."

Synopsis
A crime lord is torn between his legacy and his desire to leave the life of crime that built his empire.  A new villain tries to use the town's anti-hero network to climb to power. The crime lord must rely on his assassin protégé, who has his own troubles. In an epic battle of under-bosses and crime lords, only one will survive.

Cast

Prequel
A prequel called A Good Man was released in 2014. Seagal and Keoni reprised their roles as actor and director respectively.

References

External links 
 
 

2013 films
2013 direct-to-video films
American crime thriller films
2013 action thriller films
2013 crime thriller films
American action thriller films
John Alexander films
Direct-to-video action films
Voltage Pictures films
Films directed by Keoni Waxman
2010s English-language films
2010s American films